Brij Nagar (Commonly known as Nagar) is town and tehsil in Bharatpur district in the Indian state of Rajasthan. It is situated equidistant among Bharatpur, Alwar & Mathura. Nagar is famous for the sweets called Jaleba, a bigger version of jalebi.

Geography
It has an average elevation of 201 metres (662 feet) from the sea level.

Geographically, Nagar is a town in district Bharatpur but the closest bigger city one can think about is Alwar which is roughly at a same distance as Bharatpur is but more convenient for the people as we have higher and frequent connectivity to Alwar. Distance from Delhi is roughly around 165 km and from Jaipur it is 175 km.

Fairs 
Nagar hosts a famous fair in the month of April on the occasion of Ram Navami. Devotees come to see the Ram Rath Yatra (Procession) which passes through town's main market to 'Ram Temple'. Along with the Rathyatra, many other cultural events and competitions are also organized by the local authority and many groups come from several places and show their talent and skills on the eve. The fair lasts about a week. Every day for the week there are different municipality organized events such as Nautanki, local Kavi Sammelan (Poets' night) and guest Kavi Sammelan.

Demographics 
The Nagar city is divided into 20 wards for which elections are held every 5 years. The Nagar Municipality has population of 25,572 of which 13,582 are males while 11,990 are females as per report released by Census India 2011.

Population of Children with age of 0-6 is 3826 which is 14.96% of total population of Nagar (M). In Nagar Municipality, Female Sex Ratio is of 883 against state average of 928. Moreover Child Sex Ratio in Nagar is around 824 compared to Rajasthan state average of 888. Literacy rate of Nagar city is 73.94% higher than state average of 66.11%. In Nagar, Male literacy is around 84.80% while female literacy rate is 61.78%.

Nagar Municipality has total administration over 4,207 houses to which it supplies basic amenities like water & electricity. It is also authorized to build roads within Municipality limits and impose taxes on properties coming under its jurisdiction.

Caste-wise, the rural part of Nagar is populated mainly by Gurjars, Jatav,Muslims and jat and the urban part is dominated by Brahmins, Jatav, Jat and Vaishya.

Transport 
Nagar is well connected by both railway and road routes. Rail routes are connected from Allahabad via Mathura, Mathura, Alwar and Jaipur via Alwar. There are many RSRTC buses to Jaipur, New Delhi, Mathura, Aligarh, Alwar, Bharatpur on a regular basis.

References 

Cities and towns in Bharatpur district